Ablepharus alaicus is a species of skink found in China, Kyrgyzstan, Uzbekistan, 
Tajikistan, and Kazakhstan.

References

Ablepharus
Reptiles described in 1901
Taxa named by Vladimir S. Elpatjevsky